Bannister's rat, or great Key Island mosaic-tailed rat, or great Key Island melomys or great Kai Island melomys (Melomys bannisteri) is a species of rodent of the genus Melomys. It is endemic to the Kai Besar, one of the islands which are part of the Maluku Islands, Indonesia.

References

Melomys
Mammals of Indonesia
Mammals described in 1993
Taxa named by Darrell Kitchener